Epitaph of Plassey is the debut EP by Bangladeshi metal band Severe Dementia. It was released on April 8, 2007, by Demonstealer Records. It is considered to be the first death metal record in Bangladesh. It was highly influential in the "East Bengal Extreme Metal" scene.

Overview 

The drum tracks of the EP was recorded in Sound Garden Studio while the vocals, guitars and bass were recorded in Rock Relic Studio. It was released by Demonstealer Records in India. The sound was engineered by Saimum Hassan Nahian and Raef al Hasan Rafa. Artworks and digital illustration was done by Dhanad Islam.

Track listing 
All the tracks written by Severe Dementia.

Personnel 
 Ahmed Shawki - lead vocals
 "Schizo" Saimum Hassan Nahian - guitars
 Arefin Ahmed Sazeed - bass
 "Rhino" Raef al Hasan Rafa - drums

References 

Severe Dementia albums
2007 debut EPs